Grimms Landing is an unincorporated community in Mason County, West Virginia, United States.

History
Grimms Landing had a post office, which opened on September 9, 1878, and closed on November 2, 2002. The community was named after George Grimm, who was instrumental in securing a post office for the town.

Notable person
Gus Douglass, West Virginia Commissioner of Agriculture, was raised in Grimms Landing.

References

Unincorporated communities in Mason County, West Virginia
Unincorporated communities in West Virginia
Populated places on the Kanawha River